Enrique Cortés Pes Gallego (born 29 November 1966 in Viladecans, Barcelona) is a former Spanish baseball player. He played with Spain at the 1992 Summer Olympics. He had 1 hit in 11 at-bats over 6 games, all losses for Spain.

References

1966 births
Living people
People from Baix Llobregat
Sportspeople from the Province of Barcelona
Olympic baseball players of Spain
Spanish baseball players
Baseball players at the 1992 Summer Olympics
Baseball shortstops